Jonathan Deal is a South African environmentalist. He was awarded the Goldman Environmental Prize in 2013, in particular for his efforts on protecting the Karoo region, leading a team of scientists to bring forward environmental impacts of planned exploitation of possible shale gas in the region.

References

External links
Jonathan Deal: 2013 Goldman Environmental Prize Winner, South Africa

Date of birth unknown
Living people
South African environmentalists
Year of birth missing (living people)
Goldman Environmental Prize awardees